Maximilian Schwetz (born 9 January 1991 in Erlangen, Germany) is a German triathlete and Member of the German national triathlon team.

Results 

On March 17, 2012, Schwetz set a new German national record in 1500 m. swimming for triathletes, coming in at 16:50.2 min.

References

External links 
 Facebook fanpage of Maximilian Schwetz

1991 births
Living people
German male triathletes
Sportspeople from Erlangen